Stoianovca (Bulgarian: Стояновка) is a village in Cantemir District, Moldova. The majority of the population is composed of ethnic Bulgarians. A large proportion of Bulgarian Jews migrated to meet earlier waves of migration out of Bulgaria to Zorya, Odessa Oblast, Ukraine after a Russian boy, Mikhail Rybachenko, was found murdered in the town of Dubăsari (Dubossary), 37 km northeast of Chișinău.

A Russian language antisemitic newspaper "Bessarabian" began to disseminate rumors about the murder being part of a Jewish ritual. Although the official investigation had determined the lack of any ritualism in the murder and eventually discovered that the boy had been killed by a relative (who was later found), the unrest caused by these and other rumors had resulted in a major pogrom during the Easter holidays. The pogrom lasted for three days, without the intervention of the police. Forty seven (some say 49) Jews were killed, 92 severely wounded, 500 slightly wounded and over 700 houses destroyed.

It is also a border crossing between Moldova and Romania.

References

Villages of Cantemir District
Moldova–Romania border crossings
Populated places on the Prut
Bulgarian communities in Moldova